The 2009 FIBA Asia Championship qualification was held in early 2009 with the Gulf region, West Asia, Southeast Asia, East Asia and Middle Asia (Central Asia and South Asia) each conducting tournaments.

Qualification format
The following are eligible to participate:

 The organizing country.
 The champion team from the previous FIBA Asia Stanković Cup.
 The four best-placed teams from the previous FIBA Asia Stanković Cup will qualify the same number of teams from their respective sub-zones.
 The two best teams from the sub-zones.

FIBA Asia Stanković Cup

Qualified teams

* , which finished fourth behind Korea, Japan and China in the East Asian qualifiers, was given a wild card entry into the championship following the withdrawal of Gulf representatives Bahrain.

East Asia

The East Asia Basketball Championship for Men 2009 is the qualifying tournament for the 2009 FIBA Asia Championship. It also serves as a regional championship involving East Asian basketball teams. the two best teams excluding China qualifies for 2009 FIBA Asia Championship.

Preliminary round

Group A

Group B

Classification 5th–6th

Final round

Semifinals

3rd place

Final

Final standing

Gulf
The 19th Gulf Cup was held in Muscat, Oman.

Middle Asia

Southeast Asia
A tournament was held to determine Southeast Asia's two representatives to the FIBA Asia Championship. The qualifying tournament also served as the zonal championship, which held in Medan, Indonesia from June 6 to 9.

Preliminary round

Final

Final standing

West Asia
All the others withdrew, so  and  qualified automatically.

References

External links
fibaasia.net
Gulf Cup Results
East Asia Qualifier

2009
qualification
SEABA Championship
East Asia Basketball Championship